Sujitsingh Thakur is BJP politician from Paranda, Osmanabad, Maharashtra. He is current Member of Legislative Council of Maharashtra as a member of BJP. He is also the General Secretary of Maharashtra BJP.

Positions held
 2012: General Secretary of Maharashtra BJP
 2005: General Secretary of Maharashtra BJP
 2016: Elected as Member of Maharashtra Legislative Council
2014:- SANGHARSH YATRA
2020:- General secretary of maharashtra BJP

References

Living people
Maharashtra politicians
Bharatiya Janata Party politicians from Maharashtra
People from Osmanabad
Members of the Maharashtra Legislative Council
1967 births